Tahaya De'Von Hutchins (born February 14, 1981 in Natchez, Mississippi) is a former American football cornerback and the current Director of Player Personnel for the DC Defenders of the XFL. He was drafted by the Indianapolis Colts in the sixth round of the 2004 NFL Draft. He played college football at the University of Mississippi.

Hutchins was also a member of the Houston Texans and Atlanta Falcons in his career. The defensive back played 38 games with 16 starts for the Indianapolis Colts and Houston Texans from 2004 to 2007, and the Atlanta Falcons in 2008.

College career 
Hutchins committed to the University of Mississippi on February 7, 1999. Hutchins played in 36 games and recorded 11 interceptions.

Professional career

Indianapolis Colts 
Hutchins was selected 173rd Overall in the 2004 NFL Draft by the Indianapolis Colts.

During the 2004 NFL season, Hutchins played in 16 games, starting 1 game, and recorded 50 tackles, 1 Interception, and 1 Touchdown.

Hutchins only played in 3 games during the 2005 NFL season and only recorded 6 tackles

Hutchins was released on September 3, 2006.

Houston Texans 
The Houston Texans signed Hutchins on November 16, 2006, where he appeared in 3 games recording 6 tackles.

Hutchins signed a one-year extension with the Texans during the offseason.

During the 2007 NFL season Hutchins started in 15 games, where he recorded 95 tackles, 1 interception.

Atlanta Falcons 
On March 1, 2008, Hutchins signed a 4 year deal worth $9 million with the Atlanta Falcons.

Hutchins was placed on Injured Reserve with a  Lisfranc Injury and missed the entire 2008 NFL season.

Hutchins was released on September 1, 2009.

Executive career

Green Bay Packers 
Hutchins joined the Green Bay Packers as a Player Personnel Intern for the 2011 NFL season.

Las Vegas Raiders 
Hutchins joined the Oakland Raiders as a scout in 2012, and later became the Assistant Director of Pro Scouting in 2016.

DC Defenders 
Hutchins joined the DC Defenders in 2022 as the Director of Player Personnel.

References

1981 births
Living people
Sportspeople from Natchez, Mississippi
Players of American football from Mississippi
American football cornerbacks
Ole Miss Rebels football players
Indianapolis Colts players
Houston Texans players
Atlanta Falcons players